The Útoyggjar or Outer Islands are the islands in the Outer Periphery of the Faroe Islands. This includes the following islands: Fugloy, Svínoy, Kalsoy, Mykines, Hestur, Koltur, Skúvoy and Stóra Dímun, which have very poor connections to the rest of the country and cannot always be reached every day, often due to bad weather.

External links
 The Outer Islands association: http://www.utoyggj.fo/

Geography of the Faroe Islands